Kolkatar Harry is an 2022 Indian Bengali-language comedy children film directed by Rajdeep Ghosh and produced by Soham Chakraborty under the banner of Soham's Entertainment. The film starring Soham Chakraborty and  Priyanka Sarkar.

Cast

Soundtrack 

The music of the film is composed by Jeet Ganguly with lyrics written by Rohit Soumya.

References

External links
 

Bengali-language Indian films
2020s Bengali-language films
Films scored by Jeet Ganguly
Indian children's films